Johann Philipp Neumann (27 December 1774 – 3 October 1849) was an Austrian physicist, librarian and poet.

Born in Trebitsch in Moravia, he completed his studies at the University of Vienna. In 1803, he was appointed as a professor of physics at his local lyceum. He was transferred to the University of Graz in 1806, where he became a rector in 1811.

In 1815, he was appointed as a professor at the Polytechnic Institute in Vienna (now the Vienna University of Technology). He founded a library here in 1816, which he directed until 1845.

Neumann was a friend of the composer Franz Schubert. Neumann adapted Georg Forster's translation of Shakuntala as a libretto for an opera, which Schubert commenced in 1820 but never competed. Neumann, a liberal-minded churchman, was interested in simple music designed to appeal to "the widest possible congregation". To this end, he wrote the text of 8 hymns and a translation of the Lord's Prayer, and commissioned the Deutsche Messe from his friend in 1826.

He retired in 1844, and died in Vienna in 1849.

References 

1774 births
1849 deaths
Franz Schubert
19th-century Austrian physicists
Austrian male poets
Academic staff of the University of Graz
People from Třebíč
Austrian people of Moravian-German descent
Moravian-German people
Academic staff of TU Wien